Hdaj  is a Syrian village located in Uqayribat Subdistrict in Salamiyah District, Hama.  According to the Syria Central Bureau of Statistics (CBS), Hdaj had a population of 418 in the 2004 census. Hdaj was captured by Syrian Army on 31 August 2017.

References 

Populated places in Salamiyah District